Bartram is an English surname. Notable people with the surname include:

Clint Bartram (born 1988), Australian footballer
Ed Bartram (1938–2019), Canadian artist
Graham Bartram (born 1963), British vexillologist
James Bartram (1827–1905), England-born Australian pioneer 
Jimmy Bartram (1911–1987), English footballer
John Bartram (1699–1777), American botanist
John Bartram (athlete) (1925–2014), Australian athlete
Kenny Bartram (born 1978), American motocross rider
Richard Bartram (1749–1826), English merchant in Rome 
Sam Bartram (1914–1981), English footballer
Tracy Bartram (born 1959), Australian comedian
Vince Bartram (born 1968), English footballer
William Bartram (1739–1823), American naturalist, son of John

See also
 Bertram (name) 

English-language surnames